The Nikon Coolpix S1000pj is a compact digital camera manufactured by Nikon released in September 2009 as part of the Nikon Coolpix series. The S1000pj is the world's first compact camera to feature a built-in projector.

Features
The Coolpix S1000pj is a 12.1 effective megapixels compact digital camera. The camera also features a 2.7 inch diagonal screen which is powered 230,000-dots of resolution with an anti-glare coating.

The camera weighs  and has a rechargeable battery life of 220 shots. When projecting continuously, the camera has a battery life of approximately one hour. A projector stand and remote are included with the purchase of the camera, which allow the use of the camera wirelessly.

The Coolpix S1000pj also incorporates Nikon's Smart Portrait System, which includes automatic built in red-eye correction, face priority autofocus (which allows automatic focusing on up to 12 faces), "blink warning and proof", in which users will be warned if the picture taken has subjects with their eyes closed, and a "smile timer," in which the camera waits until a face in the frame smiles to automatically take the picture.

Accessories
The camera package includes a rechargeable Li-ion battery (EN-EL12), battery charger (MH-65), USB cable (UC-E6), audio video cable (EG-CP14), strap (AN-CP19), projector stand (ET-2), and remote control (ML-L4).

See also
 Nikon Coolpix series
 Handheld projector
 LG eXpo

References

External links

S1000pj
Point-and-shoot cameras
Cameras introduced in 2009